Ezekual Samuel James Moore (born November 30, 1997) is a professional Trinidadian-American basketball player for the Oklahoma City Blue of the NBA G League. He played college basketball for Saint Louis, Tulsa, and SIU Edwardsville.

High school career
Moore attended Riverview Gardens Senior High School in Saint Louis, Missouri where he played for his father, Gerard Moore. As a Junior in 2014–15, he ranked among the St. Louis area leading scorers, second behind Jayson Tatum, averaging 27.6 points and 4.3 assists per game while helping the Rams to an appearance in the Missouri Class 4A District finals where they lost, the squad's deepest run since 2000. As a senior in 2015-16 Moore averaged 21.1 points, 4.9 rebounds and 4.4 assists per game and helped Riverview Gardens win its first district title since 1998. He then lead them to the state quarter final where they lost to, soon to be, state champs Vashon High School. Moore ended up being Third-team All-Metro selection by the St. Louis Post-Dispatch, Missouri Basketball Coaches Association Class 4A first-team All-State pick and graduated as Riverview Gardens all time varsity scorer with 1,395 career points.

College career
As a freshman at Saint Louis in 2016–17, Moore played in 29 games, averaging 5.6 points, 2.0 rebounds and 1 assists in 20.8 minutes per game.  Moore led the Billikens in 3 point Field Goals Made (80) and percentage (.39) on the season. Becoming the first Billiken freshman to lead his team in those categories since SLU joined the A-10 in 2005–06. He recorded 5 10-plus games as a freshman, scoring 10 points against BYU in Las Vegas, 12 points against Duquesne on January 11 and a career-high 12 points against Wichita State on December 6. On March 4, Moore tied his career-high against Richmond.

After his freshman year campaign came to an end, Moore asked to be released from his scholarship. He originally signed with Tennessee Tech but ended up at Southwestern Illinois College Months later he committed to play for head coach Frank Haith and the Tulsa Golden Hurricane. He scored a season high 11 points against New Orleans. Moore played in 14 games for Tulsa and averaged 2.6 points in 10.5 minutes per game. In January 2019, he announced he was transferring again to SIU Edwardsville. Moore averaged 12.6 points, 3.6 rebounds, and 1.5 assists per game. Following the season, he announced he was forgoing his final season of collegiate eligibility to turn professional.

College statistics

|-
| style="text-align:left;"| 2016–17
| style="text-align:left;"| 
| 29 || 1 || 20.8 || .370 || .391 || .767 || 2.0 || 0.9 || 0.6 || 0.2 || 5.3
|-
| style="text-align:left;"| 2018–19
| style="text-align:left;"| 
| 14 || 4 || 10.5 || .378 || .235 || 1.000 || 1.4 || 0.4 || 0.2 || 0.1 || 2.6
|-
| style="text-align:left;"| 2019–20
| style="text-align:left;"| 
| 31 || 30 || 28.3 || .467 || .385 || .780 || 3.6 || 1.5 || 0.6 || 0.3 || 12.6
|-

Professional career
In August 2020, Moore signed a one-year contract with CB Pardinyes of the Spanish LEB Plata. In February 2021, Moore announced he was leaving the club due to personal reasons. He subsequently joined Stevnsgade Basketball of the Danish league.

In April of 2022, Moore was bought out of his contract from French Club ADA Blois Basket 41. His addition helped win the LNB B French championship.

Santa Cruz Warriors (2022–2023)
On October 24, 2022, Moore joined the Santa Cruz Warriors roster. On January 24, 2023, Moore was waived.

Oklahoma City Blue (2023–present)

Professional statistics

Personal life
Moore was born in Chicago, Illinois and raised in Granite City, Illinois. His parents are Gerard and Crystal Moore. He has 3 siblings in which he is the oldest. Two sisters, Addaya who currently plays basketball at the University of Cincinnati, and Azaria. He also has a brother Zidane who plays for Lewis & Clark Community College. His father played basketball for Hall of fame Coach Lou Henson at New Mexico State University. Zeke graduated with a degree in Education.

References

External links
Saint Louis Billikens bio
SIU Edwardsville Cougars bio
Zeke Moore Recruitment

1997 births
Living people
American men's basketball players
American expatriate basketball people in Denmark
American expatriate basketball people in Spain
Basketball players from St. Louis
Point guards
Saint Louis Billikens men's basketball players
Santa Cruz Warriors players
Shooting guards
SIU Edwardsville Cougars men's basketball players
Tulsa Golden Hurricane men's basketball players